Nikāya is a Pāli word meaning "volume". It is often used like the Sanskrit word āgama to mean "collection", "assemblage", "class" or "group" in both Pāḷi and Sanskrit. It is most commonly used in reference to the Pali Buddhist texts of the Tripitaka namely those found in the Sutta Piṭaka. It is also used to refer to monastic lineages, where it is sometimes translated as a 'monastic fraternity'. 

The term Nikāya Buddhism is sometimes used in contemporary scholarship to refer to the Buddhism of the early Buddhist schools.

Text collections
In the Pāli Canon, particularly, the "Discourse Basket" or Sutta Piṭaka, the meaning of nikāya is roughly equivalent to the English collection and is used to describe groupings of discourses according to theme, length, or other categories.  For example, the Sutta Piṭaka is broken up into five nikāyas:
 the Dīgha Nikāya, the collection of long (Pāḷi: dīgha) discourses
 the Majjhima Nikāya, the collection of middle-length (majjhima) discourses
 the Samyutta Nikāya, the collection of thematically linked (samyutta) discourses
 the Anguttara Nikāya, the "gradual collection" (discourses grouped by content enumerations)
 the Khuddaka Nikāya, the "minor collection"

In the other early Buddhist schools the alternate term āgama was used instead of nikāya to describe their Sutra Piṭakas. Thus the non-Mahāyāna portion of the Sanskrit-language Sutra Piṭaka is referred to as "the Āgamas" by Mahāyāna Buddhists. The Āgamas survive for the most part only in Classical Tibetan and Chinese translation. They correspond closely with the Pāḷi nikāyas.

Monastic divisions
Among the Theravāda nations of Southeast Asia and Sri Lanka, nikāya is also used as the term for a monastic division or lineage; these groupings are also sometimes called "monastic fraternities" or "frateries".  Nikāyas may emerge among monastic groupings as a result of royal or government patronage (such as the Dhammayuttika Nikāya of Thailand), due to the national origin of their ordination lineage (the Siam Nikāya of Sri Lanka), because of differences in the interpretation of the monastic code, or due to other factors (such as the Amarapura Nikāya in Sri Lanka, which emerged as a reaction to caste restrictions within the Siam Nikāya).  These divisions do not rise to the level of forming separate sects within the Theravāda tradition, because they do not typically follow different doctrines or monastic codes, nor do these divisions extend to the laity.

In Burma, nikaya monastic orders have emerged in response to the relative conservativeness with which the Vinayas are interpreted, and the hierarchical structure within the nikaya. Since 1980, no new nikayas have been allowed, and there are a total of nine legally recognized monastic orders in Burma today under the 1990 Law Concerning Sangha Organizations. The largest of these is the Thudhamma Nikaya, which was founded in the 1800s during the Konbaung Dynasty.

See also
 Āgama (Buddhism)
 Early Buddhist schools
 Nikaya Buddhism
 Pāḷi Canon

Notes

Bibliography
 Rhys Davids, T.W. & William Stede (eds.) (1921-5). The Pali Text Society’s Pali–English Dictionary. Chipstead: Pali Text Society. A general on-line search engine for the PED is available at http://dsal.uchicago.edu/dictionaries/pali/.

Theravada
Pāli Canon
Tripiṭaka